Jesse Campbell may refer to:

 Jesse Campbell (American football) (born 1969), former American football safety
Jesse Campbell (equestrian) (1989), New Zealand eventing rider
 Jesse Campbell (singer), American R&B singer
 Jesse M. Campbell (born 1977), American horse racing jockey